Frederick Helsher Rath Sr. (born September 1, 1943 in Little Rock, Arkansas) is a former Major League Baseball pitcher who appeared in 8 games for the Chicago White Sox during the  and  seasons. He threw right-handed.

Rath, who attended Baylor University, was drafted by the White Sox in the 4th round of the 1965 amateur draft and made his major league debut 3 years later. Following the  season he was traded to the California Angels for John Purdin, but never appeared in a major league game again.

External links

1943 births
Living people
Major League Baseball pitchers
Baseball players from Arkansas
Chicago White Sox players
Evansville White Sox players
Fox Cities Foxes players
Florida Rookie League White Sox players
Tucson Toros players
Sportspeople from Little Rock, Arkansas
Florida Instructional League White Sox players